The 2019–20 Missouri State Bears basketball team represented Missouri State University during the 2019–20 NCAA Division I men's basketball season. The Bears, led by second-year head coach Dana Ford, played their home games at JQH Arena in Springfield, Missouri as members of the Missouri Valley Conference. They finished the season 16–17, 9–9 in MVC play to finish in a tie for sixth place. They defeated Indiana State in the quarterfinals of the MVC tournament before losing in the semifinals to Valpariso.

Previous season 
The Bears finished the 2018–19 season 16–16, 10–8 in MVC play to finish in a tie for third place. As the No. 4 seed in the MVC tournament, they lost in the quarterfinals to Bradley.

Offseason

2019 recruiting class

Roster

Schedule and results

|-
!colspan=9 style=| Exhibition

|-
!colspan=9 style=|Non-conference regular season

|-
!colspan=9 style=|MVC regular season

|-
!colspan=9 style=| Missouri Valley tournament

Source

References

Missouri State Bears basketball seasons
Missouri State
Missouri State, basketball men
Missouri State, basketball men